Stephen Knight (26 September 1951 – 25 July 1985) was a British journalist and author. He is best remembered for the books  Jack the Ripper: The Final Solution (1976) and The Brotherhood (1984).

Life and works
Born in Hainault in Essex as Stephen Victor Knight, he attended West Hatch Technical High School, at nearby Chigwell. He was not successful academically, and after leaving school at 16  Knight went to work as a salesman for the London Electricity Board in Chigwell. At 18 he got a job as a reporter on the Ilford Pictorial before moving to the Hornchurch Echo.

His book Jack the Ripper: The Final Solution (1976) suggested that the Ripper murders were part of a conspiracy between Freemasons and the British Royal Family, a claim which is not accepted by historians. Nevertheless, the book became a bestseller, and was the inspiration for several works of fiction, among them the film Murder by Decree (1979) by Bob Clark and the graphic novel From Hell by Alan Moore and Eddie Campbell.  In 1980, he featured in a documentary film based on his book, produced by R.W.B. Production Australia.

The Brotherhood (1984) was published at a time when Freemasonry was coming under increasing scrutiny in the United Kingdom. Knight's last book before his death was The Killing of Justice Godfrey, exploring the death of Edmund Berry Godfrey in 1678, which had caused widespread anti-Catholic sentiment in England.

In 1983 he became a religious follower of Bhagwan Shree Rajneesh and, as a part of this interest, took the name Swami Puja Debal. He began to experience epileptic seizures in 1977, and in 1980 was discovered to have a brain tumour while taking part in a documentary for the Horizon television series. The tumour was removed, but returned in 1984.

Knight died in July 1985 at the age of 33 while staying with friends at Carradale in Argyllshire. He was buried there.

Private life
In 1976 he married Margot Kenrick, who had two daughters, Natasha and Nicole, from a previous relationship. In the same year the couple had a daughter together, Nanouska Maria Knight. The couple later separated, and in November 1980 Knight announced that, when his divorce came through, he would marry Lesley Newson, a 28-year-old researcher on Horizon. However, instead the couple later also separated. His partner during his last years was Barbara Mary Land.

Works

Non-fiction
Jack the Ripper: The Final Solution (1976)
The Brotherhood (1984)
The Killing of Justice Godfrey: an investigation into England's most remarkable unsolved murder (1984)

Fiction
Requiem at Rogano (1979)

Film 

 Jack the Ripper: The Final Solution (1980)

References

External links
Stephen Knight obituary
Jack the Ripper: The Final Solution (1980) on IMDb
Jack the Ripper: The Final Solution (1980) on the Internet Archive

1951 births
1985 deaths
Anti-Masonry
Deaths from brain tumor
English non-fiction crime writers
English non-fiction writers
People from Hainault
English male non-fiction writers
20th-century English male writers
Rajneesh movement
Burials in Scotland